Dannie Key "Danny" Lockett (born July 11, 1964) is a former American football linebacker who played two seasons with the Detroit Lions of the National Football League. He was drafted by the Detroit Lions in the sixth round of the 1987 NFL Draft. He first enrolled at the College of the Sequoias before transferring to the University of Arizona. Lockett attended Peach County High School in Fort Valley, Georgia. He was also a member of the London Monarchs, Detroit Drive/Massachusetts Marauders, Orlando Predators, Texas Terror, Connecticut Coyotes and Milwaukee Mustangs.

References

External links
Just Sports Stats

1964 births
Living people
Players of American football from Georgia (U.S. state)
American football linebackers
African-American players of American football
College of the Sequoias Giants football players
Arizona Wildcats football players
Detroit Lions players
London Monarchs players
Detroit Drive players
Massachusetts Marauders players
Orlando Predators players
Texas Terror players
Connecticut Coyotes players
Milwaukee Mustangs (1994–2001) players
People from Fort Valley, Georgia
National Football League replacement players
21st-century African-American people
20th-century African-American sportspeople